Wajegaon is a census town in the Nanded district in the Indian state of Maharashtra.

Demographics
 India census, Wajegaon had a population of 7668. Males constitute 51% of the population and females 49%. Wajegaon has an average literacy rate of 51%, lower than the national average of 59.5%: male literacy is 61%, and female literacy is 41%. In Wajegaon, 20% of the population is under 6 years of age.

References

Cities and towns in Nanded district